Come In from the Rain is the first solo album of Andi Deris, vocalist of the power metal band Helloween. It was released in 1997 and has a different sound from his band's albums, with a different style in each song.

Track listing

All songs were written by Andi Deris

"House of Pleasure" - 3:20
"Come in from the Rain" - 4:23
"Think Higher!" - 4:06
"Good Bye Jenny" - 4:13
"The King of 7 Eyes" - 4:07
"Foreign Rainbow" - 3:20
"Somewhere, Someday, Someway" - 4:06
"They Wait" - 4:25
"Now That I Know This Ain't Love" - 4:45
"Could I Leave Forever" - 3:16
"1000 Years Away" - 4:23
"In The Lights Of The Sky" (Japanese Bonus Track) - 4:43

Credits

Band members
Andi Deris – lead vocals, guitars
Peter Idera – lead guitars except solos on "The King Of 7 Eyes"
Gisbert Royder – bass except on "The King Of 7 Eyes"
Ralph G. Mason – drums, backing vocals
Oliver Noack - additional keyboards

Additional musicians
Michael Weikath – guitar solo on "The King of 7 Eyes"
Roland Grapow  – guitar solo on "The King of 7 Eyes"
Markus Grosskopf  – bass on "The King of 7 Eyes"

1997 albums
Massacre Records albums
Andi Deris albums